1997 World Masters Athletics Championships is the twelfth in a series of World Masters Athletics Outdoor Championships (called World Veterans Championships or World Veterans Athletics Championships at the time) that took place in Durban, South Africa from 17 to 27 July 1997.

 had been expelled by the International Amateur Athletic Federation in 1976 due to the apartheid policy of the South African government at that time.

South Africa rejoined IAAF in 1992, after the abolition of apartheid.

1997 marked the first time that South Africa, or any African country, has hosted a Championships in this series.

The main venue was Kings Park Athletic Stadium located in the Kings Park Sporting Precinct.

Another stadium within the complex also hosted many stadia events;

that stadium was demolished in 2006 to construct the new Moses Mabhida Stadium.

This edition of masters athletics Championships had a minimum age limit of 35 years for women and 40 years for men.

The governing body of this series is World Association of Veteran Athletes (WAVA). WAVA was formed during meeting at the inaugural edition of this series at Toronto in 1975, then officially founded during the second edition in 1977, then renamed as World Masters Athletics (WMA) at the Brisbane Championships in 2001.

This Championships was organized by WAVA in coordination with a Local Organising Committee (LOC) led by Monty Hacker, Harry Naidu, and Linda Barron.

In addition to a full range of track and field events,

non-stadia events included 10K Cross Country, 10K Race Walk (women), 20K Race Walk (men), and Marathon.

Results
Past Championships results are archived at WMA.

Additional archives are available from Museum of Masters Track & Field

as a pdf

extracted from a National Masters News pdf newsletter.

Several masters world records were set at this Championships. World records for 1997 are from the list of World Records in the National Masters News September newsletter unless otherwise noted. Among the notable performances, Phil Raschker set 7 W50 world records,

and the blind athlete Ivy Granstrom, who ran with a wrist tether attached to her guide, set 4 W85 world records.

Women

Men

References

World Masters Athletics Championships
World Masters Athletics Championships
International athletics competitions hosted by South Africa
1997
Masters athletics (track and field) records